Neil Barry (born 6 August 1966) is a Guyanese cricketer. He played in nine first-class and twelve List A matches for Guyana from 1987 to 1996.

See also
 List of Guyanese representative cricketers

References

External links
 

1966 births
Living people
Guyanese cricketers
Guyana cricketers